Mount Williams is the 4th highest peak in the Commonwealth of Massachusetts. It is located in the Greylock Range in Berkshire County. Its altitude is 2,951 feet.

Recreation

Located within the Mount Greylock State Reservation, approaches to  this peak begin at a variety of trailheads within the Reservation. Parking is available at most trailheads. The Appalachian Trail traverses the summit of Mount Williams where there is a wide vista overlooking Williamstown and North Adams, MA as well as Pine Cobble Mountain to the north.

Geology, Geography & other information

Further details about Mount Williams are included in the adjacent mountain descriptions: Greylock, Fitch and Saddle Ball.

Williams